The Cioara is a right tributary of the river Arieș in Romania. It discharges into the Arieș in Baia de Arieș.

References

Rivers of Romania
Rivers of Alba County